Andrew Bridge may refer to:

 Andrew Bridge (lighting designer), American theatre lighting designer
 Andrew Bridge (basketball) (born 1979), British basketball player
 Andrew Bridge (lawyer), American author and lawyer